Grey Highlands is a municipality in the southeast corner of Grey County, Ontario, Canada that was formed on January 1, 2001, by the amalgamation of the village of Markdale and the townships of Artemesia, Euphrasia and Osprey, which included the unincorporated hamlets of Eugenia, Ceylon, Maxwell, Singhampton, Priceville, Kimberley, Badjeros and Feversham. The former village of Flesherton is also located within the municipality; it was amalgamated with Artemesia Township in 1998.

According to the 2016 Census, the municipality covers a land area of 882 square kilometres and has a population of 9,804. The municipality has a healthy population growth and the average age (43 years old) is close to the provincial average (41 years old). The average household size is 2.5 and the average total income of all households is $94,000. The average after tax income of all households in the municipality is $77,000.

Communities
 Eugenia
 Feversham
 Flesherton
 Kimberley
 Markdale
 Vandeleur

Geography
The dominant natural feature of the area is the Niagara Escarpment, which passes through the municipality and has several ancillary features:
 the Bruce Trail, a popular hiking and multi-use trail, follows the brow of the Niagara Escarpment.
 Beaver Valley, a steep-sided and broad valley, was created during the last ice age. The eastern side of the valley, as part of the Niagara Escarpment, was designated a UNESCO Biosphere reserve in 1990. The west side of the valley is home to a number of downhill ski slopes, including Beaver Valley Ski Club.
 Eugenia Falls, where the Beaver River crosses the Niagara Escarpment, is the location of Grey County's only gold rush.

Demographics

Education
Elementary students (Kindergarten to grade 8) are divided into three catchment areas:
 MacPhail Memorial Elementary School serves the Flesherton area.
 Osprey Central School serves the Maxwell and Feversham area.
 Beavercrest Community School serves the Markdale and surrounding area.

All of these students go to Grey Highlands Secondary School in Flesherton for Grades 9-12.

See also
List of townships in Ontario
Beaver Valley Ski Club

References

Further reading
 Split Rail Country: A History of Artemesia Volume I now online
 Split Rail Country: A History of Artemesia Volume II 1985-2000 is being written

External links 

Lower-tier municipalities in Ontario
Municipalities in Grey County
Niagara Escarpment